Killjoy is the debut studio album by English record producer Fox Stevenson. Killjoy was released on 18 October 2019 on Tom Sarig's record label, AntiFragile Music.

Track listing

Personnel
Stanley Stevenson Byrne – vocals, production, mastering
Hannah Trigwell – backing vocals 
Dan Sawyer – drums
 Bruce Charles – guitars
 Eric Hayes – guitar 
 Krishna Thiruchelvam - guitar 
 Rob Slater - guitar 
 Nightwatch - production 
 Lee Smith - recording engineer 
 Jamie Hart - recording engineer

References

2019 debut albums
Fox Stevenson albums